Chesias linogrisearia is a moth of the family Geometridae. It is found on Sardinia.

References

linogrisearia
Moths of Europe
Moths described in 1888